Andreyevsky (masculine), Andreyevskaya (feminine), or Andreyevskoye (neuter) is the name of several rural localities in Russia.

Modern localities

Altai Krai
As of 2014, one rural locality in Altai Krai bears this name:

Andreyevsky, Altai Krai (or Andreyevskoye), a settlement in Oktyabrsky Selsoviet of Zmeinogorsky District;

Arkhangelsk Oblast
As of 2014, nine rural localities in Arkhangelsk Oblast bear this name:

Andreyevskaya, Kargopolsky District, Arkhangelsk Oblast, a village in Priozerny Selsoviet of Kargopolsky District; 
Andreyevskaya, Kotlassky District, Arkhangelsk Oblast, a village in Pacheozersky Selsoviet of Kotlassky District; 
Andreyevskaya, Krasnoborsky District, Arkhangelsk Oblast, a village in Cherevkovsky Selsoviet of Krasnoborsky District; 
Andreyevskaya, Andreyevsky Selsoviet, Nyandomsky District, Arkhangelsk Oblast, a village in Andreyevsky Selsoviet of Nyandomsky District; 
Andreyevskaya, Shalakushsky Selsoviet, Nyandomsky District, Arkhangelsk Oblast, a village in Shalakushsky Selsoviet of Nyandomsky District; 
Andreyevskaya, Shenkursky District, Arkhangelsk Oblast, a village in Rovdinsky Selsoviet of Shenkursky District; 
Andreyevskaya, Seftrensky Selsoviet, Verkhnetoyemsky District, Arkhangelsk Oblast, a village in Seftrensky Selsoviet of Verkhnetoyemsky District; 
Andreyevskaya, Timoshinsky Selsoviet, Verkhnetoyemsky District, Arkhangelsk Oblast, a village in Timoshinsky Selsoviet of Verkhnetoyemsky District; 
Andreyevskaya, Vilegodsky District, Arkhangelsk Oblast, a village in Nikolsky Selsoviet of Vilegodsky District;

Republic of Bashkortostan
As of 2014, one rural locality in the Republic of Bashkortostan bears this name:

Andreyevsky, Republic of Bashkortostan, a khutor in Alexandrovsky Selsoviet of Meleuzovsky District;

Chelyabinsk Oblast
As of 2014, two rural localities in Chelyabinsk Oblast bear this name:

Andreyevsky, Bredinsky District, Chelyabinsk Oblast (or Andreyevskoye), a settlement in Andreyevsky Selsoviet of Bredinsky District; 
Andreyevsky, Plastovsky District, Chelyabinsk Oblast, a settlement in Borisovsky Selsoviet of Plastovsky District;

Ivanovo Oblast
As of 2014, three rural localities in Ivanovo Oblast bear this name:

Andreyevskoye, Privolzhsky District, Ivanovo Oblast, a village in Privolzhsky District; 
Andreyevskoye, Rodnikovsky District, Ivanovo Oblast, a village in Rodnikovsky District; 
Andreyevskaya, Ivanovo Oblast, a village in Lukhsky District;

Kaluga Oblast
As of 2014, four rural localities in Kaluga Oblast bear this name:
Andreyevskoye, Kaluga, Kaluga Oblast, a village under the administrative jurisdiction of the City of Kaluga
Andreyevskoye, Dzerzhinsky District, Kaluga Oblast, a village in Dzerzhinsky District
Andreyevskoye, Ferzikovsky District, Kaluga Oblast, a village in Ferzikovsky District
Andreyevskoye, Tarussky District, Kaluga Oblast, a village in Tarussky District

Kirov Oblast
As of 2014, one rural locality in Kirov Oblast bears this name:

Andreyevsky, Kirov Oblast, a settlement in Bogdanovsky Rural Okrug of Urzhumsky District;

Kostroma Oblast
As of 2014, four rural localities in Kostroma Oblast bear this name:

Andreyevskoye, Buysky District, Kostroma Oblast, a village in Tsentralnoye Settlement of Buysky District; 
Andreyevskoye, Chukhlomsky District, Kostroma Oblast, a village in Nozhkinskoye Settlement of Chukhlomsky District; 
Andreyevskoye, Makaryevsky District, Kostroma Oblast, a village in Ust-Neyskoye Settlement of Makaryevsky District; 
Andreyevskoye, Susaninsky District, Kostroma Oblast, a selo in Andreyevskoye Settlement of Susaninsky District;

Krasnodar Krai
As of 2014, one rural locality in Krasnodar Krai bears this name:

Andreyevskaya, Krasnodar Krai, a stanitsa in Boykoponursky Rural Okrug of Kalininsky District;

Kursk Oblast
As of 2014, one rural locality in Kursk Oblast bears this name:
Andreyevsky, Kursk Oblast, a settlement in Skorodnyansky Selsoviet of Bolshesoldatsky District

Mari El Republic
As of 2014, one rural locality in the Mari El Republic bears this name:

Andreyevsky, Mari El Republic, a pochinok under the administrative jurisdiction of Mari-Turek Urban-Type Settlement in Mari-Tureksky District;

Federal city of Moscow
As of 2014, one rural locality in the federal city of Moscow bears this name:
Andreyevskoye, Moscow, a village in Ryazanovskoye Settlement of Novomoskovsky Administrative Okrug

Moscow Oblast
As of 2014, seven rural localities in Moscow Oblast bear this name:

Andreyevskoye, Istrinsky District, Moscow Oblast, a village in Yermolinskoye Rural Settlement of Istrinsky District; 
Andreyevskoye, Kashirsky District, Moscow Oblast (or Andreyevskaya), a village in Znamenskoye Rural Settlement of Kashirsky District; 
Andreyevskoye, Kolomensky District, Moscow Oblast, a selo in Provodnikovskoye Rural Settlement of Kolomensky District; 
Andreyevskoye, Leninsky District, Moscow Oblast (or Andreyevskaya), a village in Molokovskoye Rural Settlement of Leninsky District; 
Andreyevskoye, Mozhaysky District, Moscow Oblast, a village in Borisovskoye Rural Settlement of Mozhaysky District; 
Andreyevskoye, Odintsovsky District, Moscow Oblast, a selo in Yershovskoye Rural Settlement of Odintsovsky District; 
Andreyevskoye, Shakhovskoy District, Moscow Oblast (or Andreyevskaya), a village in Stepankovskoye Rural Settlement of Shakhovskoy District;

Omsk Oblast
As of 2014, one rural locality in Omsk Oblast bears this name:

Andreyevsky, Omsk Oblast, a settlement in Andreyevsky Rural Okrug of Omsky District;

Orenburg Oblast
As of 2014, one rural locality in Orenburg Oblast bears this name:
Andreyevsky, Orenburg Oblast, a khutor in Troitsky Selsoviet of Tyulgansky District

Rostov Oblast
As of 2014, one rural locality in Rostov Oblast bears this name:

Andreyevskaya, Rostov Oblast, a stanitsa in Andreyevskoye Rural Settlement of Dubovsky District;

Sakha Republic
As of 2014, one rural locality in the Sakha Republic bears this name:
Andreyevsky, Sakha Republic, a selo in Yedyugeysky Rural Okrug of Verkhnevilyuysky District

Smolensk Oblast
As of 2014, one rural locality in Smolensk Oblast bears this name:
Andreyevskoye, Smolensk Oblast, a village in Leonidovskoye Rural Settlement of Yelninsky District

Stavropol Krai
As of 2014, two rural localities in Stavropol Krai bear this name:
Andreyevsky, Kochubeyevsky District, Stavropol Krai, a khutor in Vasilyevsky Selsoviet of Kochubeyevsky District
Andreyevsky, Sovetsky District, Stavropol Krai, a khutor in Soldato-Alexsandrovsky Selsoviet of Sovetsky District

Tver Oblast
As of 2014, seven rural localities in Tver Oblast bear this name:
Andreyevskoye, Bezhetsky District, Tver Oblast, a village in Filippkovskoye Rural Settlement of Bezhetsky District
Andreyevskoye, Kalininsky District, Tver Oblast, a village in Zavolzhskoye Rural Settlement of Kalininsky District
Andreyevskoye, Kalyazinsky District, Tver Oblast, a village in Nerlskoye Rural Settlement of Kalyazinsky District
Andreyevskoye, Konakovsky District, Tver Oblast, a village in Gorodenskoye Rural Settlement of Konakovsky District
Andreyevskoye, Rameshkovsky District, Tver Oblast, a selo in Kiverichi Rural Settlement of Rameshkovsky District
Andreyevskoye, Rzhevsky District, Tver Oblast, a village in Itomlya Rural Settlement of Rzhevsky District
Andreyevskoye, Zapadnodvinsky District, Tver Oblast, a village in Sharapovskoye Rural Settlement of Zapadnodvinsky District

Tyumen Oblast
As of 2014, one rural locality in Tyumen Oblast bears this name:
Andreyevsky, Tyumen Oblast, a settlement in Andreyevsky Rural Okrug of Tyumensky District

Udmurt Republic
As of 2014, one rural locality in the Udmurt Republic bears this name:
Andreyevsky, Udmurt Republic, a pochinok in Mysovsky Selsoviet of Kezsky District

Vladimir Oblast
As of 2014, five rural localities in Vladimir Oblast bear this name:
Andreyevskoye, Alexandrovsky District, Vladimir Oblast, a selo in Alexandrovsky District
Andreyevskoye (Krasnoselskoye Rural Settlement), Yuryev-Polsky District, Vladimir Oblast, a selo in Yuryev-Polsky District; municipally, a part of Krasnoselskoye Rural Settlement of that district
Andreyevskoye (Nebylovskoye Rural Settlement), Yuryev-Polsky District, Vladimir Oblast, a selo in Yuryev-Polsky District; municipally, a part of Nebylovskoye Rural Settlement of that district
Andreyevskaya, Gus-Khrustalny District, Vladimir Oblast, a village in Gus-Khrustalny District
Andreyevskaya, Petushinsky District, Vladimir Oblast, a selo in Petushinsky District

Volgograd Oblast
As of 2014, one rural locality in Volgograd Oblast bears this name:
Andreyevsky, Volgograd Oblast, a khutor in Khopersky Selsoviet of Novonikolayevsky District

Vologda Oblast
As of 2014, fifteen rural localities in Vologda Oblast bear this name:
Andreyevskoye, Babushkinsky District, Vologda Oblast, a selo in Roslyatinsky Selsoviet of Babushkinsky District
Andreyevskoye, Sokolsky District, Vologda Oblast, a village in Chuchkovsky Selsoviet of Sokolsky District
Andreyevskoye, Ust-Kubinsky District, Vologda Oblast, a village in Ustyansky Selsoviet of Ust-Kubinsky District
Andreyevskoye, Vologodsky District, Vologda Oblast, a village in Podlesny Selsoviet of Vologodsky District
Andreyevskaya, Kharovsky District, Vologda Oblast, a village in Kumzersky Selsoviet of Kharovsky District
Andreyevskaya, Korotetsky Selsoviet, Kirillovsky District, Vologda Oblast, a village in Korotetsky Selsoviet of Kirillovsky District
Andreyevskaya, Kovarzinsky Selsoviet, Kirillovsky District, Vologda Oblast, a village in Kovarzinsky Selsoviet of Kirillovsky District
Andreyevskaya, Syamzhensky District, Vologda Oblast, a village in Zhityevsky Selsoviet of Syamzhensky District
Andreyevskaya, Markushevsky Selsoviet, Tarnogsky District, Vologda Oblast, a village in Markushevsky Selsoviet of Tarnogsky District
Andreyevskaya, Ozeretsky Selsoviet, Tarnogsky District, Vologda Oblast, a village in Ozeretsky Selsoviet of Tarnogsky District
Andreyevskaya, Ust-Kubinsky District, Vologda Oblast, a village in Avksentyevsky Selsoviet of Ust-Kubinsky District
Andreyevskaya, Vashkinsky District, Vologda Oblast, a village in Andreyevsky Selsoviet of Vashkinsky District
Andreyevskaya, Verkhovazhsky District, Vologda Oblast, a village in Naumovsky Selsoviet of Verkhovazhsky District
Andreyevskaya, Vozhegodsky District, Vologda Oblast, a village in Punemsky Selsoviet of Vozhegodsky District
Andreyevskaya, Vytegorsky District, Vologda Oblast, a village in Devyatinsky Selsoviet of Vytegorsky District

Yaroslavl Oblast
As of 2014, thirteen rural localities in Yaroslavl Oblast bear this name:
Andreyevskoye, Blagoveshchensky Rural Okrug, Bolsheselsky District, Yaroslavl Oblast, a selo in Blagoveshchensky Rural Okrug of Bolsheselsky District
Andreyevskoye, Chudinovsky Rural Okrug, Bolsheselsky District, Yaroslavl Oblast, a village in Chudinovsky Rural Okrug of Bolsheselsky District
Andreyevskoye, Andreyevsky Rural Okrug, Borisoglebsky District, Yaroslavl Oblast, a selo in Andreyevsky Rural Okrug of Borisoglebsky District
Andreyevskoye, Demyanovsky Rural Okrug, Borisoglebsky District, Yaroslavl Oblast, a village in Demyanovsky Rural Okrug of Borisoglebsky District
Andreyevskoye, Nekouzsky District, Yaroslavl Oblast, a mestechko in Shestikhinsky Rural Okrug of Nekouzsky District
Andreyevskoye, Nekrasovsky District, Yaroslavl Oblast, a village in Nikolsky Rural Okrug of Nekrasovsky District
Andreyevskoye, Pereslavsky District, Yaroslavl Oblast, a village in Lychensky Rural Okrug of Pereslavsky District
Andreyevskoye, Poshekhonsky District, Yaroslavl Oblast, a village in Yermakovsky Rural Okrug of Poshekhonsky District
Andreyevskoye, Rostovsky District, Yaroslavl Oblast, a village in Lyubilkovsky Rural Okrug of Rostovsky District
Andreyevskoye, Rybinsky District, Yaroslavl Oblast, a village in Oktyabrsky Rural Okrug of Rybinsky District
Andreyevskoye, Gavrilovsky Rural Okrug, Yaroslavsky District, Yaroslavl Oblast, a village in Gavrilovsky Rural Okrug of Yaroslavsky District
Andreyevskoye, Tochishchensky Rural Okrug, Yaroslavsky District, Yaroslavl Oblast, a village in Tochishchensky Rural Okrug of Yaroslavsky District
Andreyevskaya, Yaroslavl Oblast, a village in Florovsky Rural Okrug of Myshkinsky District

Alternative names
Andreyevsky, alternative name of Andreyevka, a settlement in Zerkalsky Selsoviet of Shipunovsky District in Altai Krai; 
Andreyevsky, alternative name of Andreyevka, a selo in Prokhorovsky District of Belgorod Oblast; municipally, a part of Kholodnyanskoye Rural Settlement of that district; 
Andreyevsky, alternative name of Andreyevka, a village in Klyukovensky Rural Administrative Okrug of Navlinsky District in Bryansk Oblast; 
Andreyevsky, alternative name of Andreyevka, a village in Kuybyshevsky District of Novosibirsk Oblast; 
Andreyevsky, alternative name of Andreyevka, a village in Bogolyubovsky Rural Okrug of Lyubinsky District in Omsk Oblast; 
Andreyevskaya, alternative name of Novoandreyevka, a selo under the administrative jurisdiction of the City of Miass in Chelyabinsk Oblast; 
Andreyevskaya, alternative name of Andreyevka, a village in Petrovsky Selsoviet of Uvelsky District in Chelyabinsk Oblast; 
Andreyevskaya, alternative name of Andreyevskiye Vyselki, a village under the administrative jurisdiction of the Town of Shatura in Shatursky District of Moscow Oblast; 
Andreyevskaya, alternative name of Andreyevka, a village in Andreyevsky Rural Okrug of Okoneshnikovsky District in Omsk Oblast; 
Andreyevskoye, alternative name of Andreyevka, a selo in Andreyevsky Selsoviet of Ilishevsky District in the Republic of Bashkortostan; 
Andreyevskoye, alternative name of Andreyevka, a village in Nepetsinskoye Rural Settlement of Kolomensky District in Moscow Oblast; 
Andreyevskoye, alternative name of Andreyevka, a work settlement under the administrative jurisdiction of Andreyevka Work Settlement in Solnechnogorsky District of Moscow Oblast; 
Andreyevskoye, alternative name of Andreyevka, a selo in Bagansky District of Novosibirsk Oblast;

See also
Andreyevka